The Netherlands national cricket team are toured Scotland in July 2014 to play three limited overs matches. After both countries have been involved in limited-overs competition in the North Sea Pro 20 and North Sea Pro 50 overs series in May-June 2014. The main aim for Scotland was finalising their squad for the 2015 World Cup.

Squads

Limited-overs series

1st Match

2nd Match

3rd Match

References

External links
 Series at CricInfo

International cricket competitions in 2014
2014 in Scottish cricket
2014 in cricket